Mehrinoz Abbosova (born July 23, 1995; Chortoq District, Namangan Region, Uzbekistan) is an Uzbek poetess, journalist, and literary critic. She served as the first chairwoman of the Republican Council of Young Artists from 2017 to 2022. Since 2022, Abbosova has served as an advisor to the director of the Youth Affairs Agency of the Republic of Uzbekistan. She has been a member of the Uzbekistan Writers Association since 2018. She was awarded the state Zulfiya Award in 2012 and Shuhrat Medal in 2017. Her poetry collections "Men yoshlikman" (2011) and "Yulduzrang qoʻshiqlar" (2014) were published on the recommendation of the Writers' Union of Uzbekistan. 

In 2017, Abbosova was recognized by Shavkat Mirziyoyev, the president of Uzbekistan, and was appointed chairwoman of the newly established Republican Council of Young Artists at his suggestion. In her position as chairwoman of the council, she organized and led numerous forums, festivals, contests, conferences, and social projects to support young artists across Uzbekistan. Abbosova was also involved in several large-scale projects aimed at creating quality digital content in Uzbek, including the WikiStipendiya edit-a-thon launched on the Uzbek Wikipedia.

Biography 

Mehrinoz Abbasova was born on July 23, 1995, in Chortoq District, Namangan Region. She was the youngest of 3 children. Mehrinoz mentions her father Nosirjon Dehqonov as her first teacher.

Abbosova spent her childhood in the Uzbekistani cities of Chortoq and Namangan. In 2002, she started studying at the secondary school No. 45 in the district. After her family moved to Namangan in 2004, she studied at secondary school No. 57 from 2004 to 2007, as well as specialized school No. 57 from 2007 to 2011. Since 2011, she has studied at an academic lyceum at No. 2 under Namangan State University. She began studying English in 4th grade. Abbosova participated in artistic gymnastics, dance clubs, and learned to play piano. She tutored at a music school. She wished to study at the Tashkent Medical Institute, becoming a doctor, and one day working for the World Health Organization, treating people in environmentally disadvantaged regions around the world.

Becoming interested in poetry, she met writers from Namangan— Ziyaviddin Mansur, Gulomjon Akbarov and others from a young age. In 2012, she won the Zulfiya State Prize in the field of literature. Her books "Men yoshlikman" (2011)  and "Yulduzrang qo'shiqlar" (2014) were published with the recommendation of the Uzbekistan Writers Association.

In 2014, Abbosova entered the Faculty of International Journalism of the Uzbekistan State University of World Languages. In 2017, she gave a speech at the 4th congress of the Kamalot Youth Social Movement. This speech caused President Shavkat Mirziyoyev to become interested in her. By the invitation of the president, Abbasova was appointed to the position of the chairman of the newly established Republican Council of Young Artists while she was still a student. In order to support artists, the Council organized the „Respublika yosh ijodkorlar forumi“, „Oʻzbekiston bahori“, „Samarqand sheʼr oqshomlari“, „Toshkent ilhomlari“ festivals; „Buyuklar biz bilan“, „Izhor“, „Duel“ competitions; „Tarjimonlar haftaligi“, „Zomin jilgʻalari“ conferences; „Orol odamlari“, „Cheksiz ijod-cheksiz imkon“ social projects. In 2017, she was awarded the Medal of Fame.

From 2018 to 2020, she completed a master's degree at the Higher Literature Course of Alisher Navoi Tashkent State University of Uzbek Language and Literature. In 2018, she became a member of the Writers' Association of Uzbekistan. Since February 11, 2022, she has worked as an adviser to the director of the Youth Affairs Agency of the Republic of Uzbekistan on issues of the State language.

Abbasova has contributed to the organization and implementation of several large projects in the Youth Affairs Agency of the Republic of Uzbekistan, in particular, the WikiStipendiya marathon. President of Uzbekistan Shavkat Mirziyoyev on June 30, 2022, in a speech at a solemn event dedicated to Youth Day mentioned this and said:

Family 
Abbosova is married to Xushnud Xudoyberdiyev, an Uzbek blogger and lawyer. They have one son, Mustafo.

References

External links 

 Mehrinoz Abbosova on Instagram
 Mehrinoz Abbosova on Telegram

1995 births
Living people
Uzbekistani journalists
21st-century Uzbekistani poets
21st-century Uzbekistani politicians